Whitcomb is an unincorporated community located in the town of Wittenberg, Shawano County, Wisconsin, United States.

History
A post office called Whitcomb was established in 1881, and remained in operation until it was discontinued in 1922. The community was named for H. F. Whitcomb, a railroad official.

References

Unincorporated communities in Shawano County, Wisconsin
Unincorporated communities in Wisconsin